Autonomous system may refer to:

 Autonomous system (Internet), a collection of IP networks and routers under the control of one entity
 Autonomous system (mathematics), a system of ordinary differential equations which does not depend on the independent variable
 Autonomous robot, robots which can perform desired tasks in unstructured environments without continuous human guidance
 Autonomous underwater vehicle, a system that travels underwater without requiring input from an operator.